The Agreement on the Rescue of Astronauts, the Return of Astronauts and the Return of Objects Launched into Outer Space, also referred to as the Rescue Agreement is an international agreement setting forth rights and obligations of states concerning the rescue of persons in space. The Agreement was created by a 19 December 1967 consensus vote in the United Nations General Assembly (Resolution 2345 (XXII)).  It came into force on 3 December 1968. Its provisions elaborate on the rescue provisions in Article V of the 1967 Outer Space Treaty. Despite containing more specificity and detail than the rescue provision in Article V of the Outer Space Treaty, the Rescue Agreement still suffers from vague drafting and the possibility of differing interpretation.

History
The UN General Assembly adopted the text of the Rescue Agreement on 19 December 1967 through Resolution 2345 (XXII). The Agreement opened for signature on 22 April 1968, and it entered into force on 3 December 1968. As of January 2022, 98 States have ratified the Rescue Agreement, 23 have signed, and three international intergovernmental organizations (the European Space Agency, the Intersputnik International Organization of Space Communications, and the European Organisation for the Exploitation of Meteorological Satellites) have declared their acceptance of the rights and obligations conferred by the agreement.

Basic provisions
The Rescue Agreement requires that any state party that becomes aware that the personnel of a spacecraft are in distress must notify the launching authority and the Secretary General of the United Nations.

The Rescue Agreement essentially provides that any state that is a party to the agreement must provide all possible assistance to rescue the personnel of a spacecraft who have landed within that state's territory, whether because of an accident, distress, emergency, or unintended landing.  If the distress occurs in an area that is beyond the territory of any nation, then any state party that is in a position to do so shall, if necessary, extend assistance in the search and rescue operation.

Key changes since the Outer Space Treaty

Parties entitled to be rescued
The Outer Space Treaty of 1967 states simply that astronauts are to be rendered all possible assistance by state parties to the treaty.  The Outer Space Treaty does not provide a definition for the term "astronaut", and as a result it is unclear whether this provision applies to, for example, a space tourist—a person who clearly has not received the training of a traditional astronaut.

The Rescue Agreement adds some clarity to the issue by referring to the "personnel of a spacecraft" rather than "astronauts". However, this phrase again leaves uncertain whether someone simply along for the ride—such as a tourist on a Virgin Galactic flight—would be considered part of the "personnel of a spacecraft".

Compensation for recovery of a space object
In the event that a space object or its parts land in the territory of another state party, the state where the object lands is required (upon the request of the launching authority) to recover the space object and return it to the launching authority.  The Rescue Agreement provides that the launching state must then compensate the state for the costs incurred in recovering and returning the space object.

Rescue in space 
At the time the treaty was drafted, the prospect of rescuing travelers in space was unlikely, due to the limited launch capabilities of even the most advanced space programs, but it has since become more plausible. For example, Mir and later the International Space Station have each maintained docked Russian Soyuz spacecraft to be used as an escape mechanism in the event of an in-orbit emergency; in certain scenarios this vessel might also be able to assist in a rescue.

A significant shift in attitudes toward in-orbit rescues came as a result of the Space Shuttle Columbia disaster, after which NASA took steps to prepare the STS-3xx or Launch on Need missions to provide for rescue in certain scenarios. However, this capability was never exercised during the remainder of the Space Shuttle program.

Criticism
The Rescue Agreement has been criticised for being vague, especially regarding the definition of who is entitled to be rescued and the definition of what constitutes a spacecraft and its component parts.

The cost burden of a rescue mission is also not addressed in the agreement. The Rescue Agreement does provide that the launching state must bear the costs for the recovery of a craft that crashes into another state's territory. However, the agreement makes no mention of the cost of the rescue of astronauts.

References

External links
 Agreement on the Rescue of Astronauts, the Return of Astronauts and the Return of Objects Launched into Outer Space (Full Text)

Space treaties
Treaties concluded in 1967
Treaties entered into force in 1968
Treaties adopted by United Nations General Assembly resolutions
Treaties of Antigua and Barbuda
Treaties of Argentina
Treaties of Australia
Treaties of Austria
Treaties of the Bahamas
Treaties of the Byelorussian Soviet Socialist Republic
Treaties of Barbados
Treaties of Belgium
Treaties of Bosnia and Herzegovina
Treaties of Botswana
Treaties of the military dictatorship in Brazil
Treaties of the People's Republic of Bulgaria
Treaties of Cameroon
Treaties of Canada
Treaties of Chile
Treaties of the People's Republic of China
Treaties of Cuba
Treaties of Cyprus
Treaties of the Czech Republic
Treaties of Czechoslovakia
Treaties of Denmark
Treaties of Ecuador
Treaties of Egypt
Treaties of El Salvador
Treaties of Fiji
Treaties of Finland
Treaties of France
Treaties of Gabon
Treaties of the Gambia
Treaties of Georgia (country)
Treaties of West Germany
Treaties of East Germany
Treaties of the Kingdom of Greece
Treaties of Guinea-Bissau
Treaties of Guyana
Treaties of the Hungarian People's Republic
Treaties of Iceland
Treaties of India
Treaties of Indonesia
Treaties of Pahlavi Iran
Treaties of Ba'athist Iraq
Treaties of Ireland
Treaties of Israel
Treaties of Italy
Treaties of Japan
Treaties of Kazakhstan
Treaties of Kuwait
Treaties of the Kingdom of Laos
Treaties of Lebanon
Treaties of Madagascar
Treaties of the Maldives
Treaties of Mauritius
Treaties of Mexico
Treaties of the Mongolian People's Republic
Treaties of Montenegro
Treaties of Morocco
Treaties of Nepal
Treaties of the Netherlands
Treaties of New Zealand
Treaties of Niger
Treaties of Nigeria
Treaties of Norway
Treaties of Pakistan
Treaties of Papua New Guinea
Treaties of Peru
Treaties of the Polish People's Republic
Treaties of the Estado Novo (Portugal)
Treaties of Qatar
Treaties of South Korea
Treaties of the Socialist Republic of Romania
Treaties of the Soviet Union
Treaties of Saint Vincent and the Grenadines
Treaties of San Marino
Treaties of Serbia and Montenegro
Treaties of Seychelles
Treaties of Singapore
Treaties of Slovakia
Treaties of Slovenia
Treaties of South Africa
Treaties of Francoist Spain
Treaties of Sri Lanka
Treaties of Eswatini
Treaties of Sweden
Treaties of Switzerland
Treaties of Syria
Treaties of Thailand
Treaties of Tonga
Treaties of Tunisia
Treaties of Turkey
Treaties of the Ukrainian Soviet Socialist Republic
Treaties of the United Kingdom
Treaties of the United States
Treaties of Uruguay
Treaties of Yugoslavia
Treaties of Zambia
Treaties extended to Aruba
Treaties extended to the Netherlands Antilles
Treaties extended to Anguilla
Treaties extended to the Faroe Islands
Treaties extended to Greenland
Treaties extended to Bermuda
Treaties extended to the British Virgin Islands
Treaties extended to the Cayman Islands
Treaties extended to the Falkland Islands
Treaties extended to Gibraltar
Treaties extended to Montserrat
Treaties extended to the Pitcairn Islands
Treaties extended to Saint Helena, Ascension and Tristan da Cunha
Treaties extended to South Georgia and the South Sandwich Islands
Treaties extended to the Turks and Caicos Islands